The men's freestyle 57 kilograms is a competition featured at the 2017 World Wrestling Championships, and was held in Paris, France on 25 August 2017.

This freestyle wrestling competition consisted of a single-elimination tournament, with a repechage used to determine the winners of two bronze medals. The two finalists faced off for gold and silver medals. Each wrestler who lost to one of the two finalists moved into the repechage, culminating in a pair of bronze medal matches featuring the semifinal losers each facing the remaining repechage opponent from their half of the bracket.

Results

Final

Top half

Bottom half

Repechage

References

External links
Official website

Men's freestyle 57 kg